Harriet McIlquham ( Medley; 8 August 1837 – 24 January 1910), also seen as Harriett McIlquham, was an English suffragist.

Early life
Harriet Medley was born in Brick Lane, London, the daughter of Edward Medley (a baker) and Harriet Sanders Medley.

Political activism and writing
McIlquham became a member of the Manchester Society for Women's Suffrage by 1877. She was also a member of the Bristol and West of England Society for Women's Suffrage. In 1881, she co-organized the Birmingham Grand Demonstration with Maria Colby, and spoke at the Bradford demonstration.  In 1889, she was a member of the Central National Society, and co-founded the Women's Franchise League with Alice Cliff Scatcherd and Elizabeth Clarke Wolstenholme-Elmy, and was the league's first president. 

She co-founded the Women's Emancipation Union in 1892, and served on that organisation's council. She was also a member of the Cheltenham branch of the National Union of Women's Suffrage Societies, but also worked with and donated to the Women's Social and Political Union.

McIlquham was elected a Poor Law guardian for Boddlington in 1881, the first married woman elected to that office. 

Her qualifications were questioned, but because she also held property in her own name, the challenge failed. She carried this experience into her further activism, taking particular interest in married women's political rights. She also became overseer of the parish of Staverton, and first chair of the Staverton parish council, among other local appointments.

McIlquham published pamphlets based on her lectures, among them "The Enfranchisement of Women: An Ancient Right, A Modern Need" in 1892. She also wrote a series of essays on the history of feminism for the Westminster Review.

Personal life
Harriet Medley married James Henry McIlquham in 1858. They had four children and lived in Gloucestershire.  She died in 1910, aged 72 years, just hours after her paper on poet Robert Williams Buchanan was read at the Cheltenham Ethical Society. Her gravesite is in the churchyard at Tewkesbury Abbey.

The papers of Harriet McIlquham are archived in The Women's Library.

References

1837 births
1910 deaths
English suffragists
Women's suffrage in the United Kingdom